KEPS (1270 AM) is a radio station licensed to serve Eagle Pass, Texas, United States. The station is owned by Javier Navarro Galindo, through licensee South Texas Radio, LLC.

Until June 29, 2022, KEPS broadcast a Spanish Contemporary music format.  The station also broadcast local news, sports, plus CNN en Español newscasts.

History
KEPS has been on air since 1957. It was initially owned by Uvalde Broadcasters and was sold in 1964 to Eagle Pass Broadcasters, both in the Harpole family. Texrock Radio bought the station in early 1998.

In 2013, Rhattigan Broadcasting sold KEPS and KINL to MBM Eagle Pass Radio, a subsidiary of R Communications.

On June 29, 2022, KEPS ceased operations.

Previous logo

References

External links
KEPS 1270 Facebook
KEPS official website

EPS
Maverick County, Texas
Radio stations established in 1975